Mandera is an administrative ward in Chalinze District of Pwani Region in Tanzania. 
According to the 2012 census, the ward has a total population of 9,365.

References

Geography of Pwani Region